Davy Burke (born about 1987 or 8) is a Gaelic football manager and former player. He has been manager of the Roscommon county team since 2022. He formerly managed Wicklow.

Career
Burke's playing career (including underage with Kildare) was brought to an end by numerous injuries, including two torn cruciates and a cracked kneecap. He had a replacement plastic kneecap put in.

Burke, who is from County Kildare, managed Kildare to the 2018 All-Ireland Under 20 Football Championship. Appointed in November 2017, he resigned in October 2018. He then managed Maynooth in the Sigerson Cup. While managing Sarsfields of Newbridge in 2019 (he led them to the 2019 Kildare Senior Football Championship), Burke was mentioned as a possible Kildare senior manager before Jack O'Connor took the role. Burke was subsequently appointed Wicklow manager in September 2019 at the age of 31, becoming the youngest manager then active at this level of the sport. Burke was also the youngest senior inter-county manager to have ever been appointed. He expressed interest in recruiting players from other counties who have family ties to Wicklow. He departed as Wicklow manager in August 2021.

In October 2022, Burke was appointed as Roscommon manager for a three-year term. At the time of his appointment he was manager Maynooth University's Sigerson Cup team.

Personal life
Burke has a wife.

References

1980s births
Living people
Coaches of Gaelic football teams at Irish universities
Gaelic football managers
Kildare Gaelic footballers